Rainbows End is a rural settlement at the end of Green Road between the Oak River and Matakana River in Auckland Region. Sandspit is across the Oak River directly south.

Rainbows End Reserve is a small waterfront park with a boat ramp and jetty.

Demographics
Rainbows End is part of the larger Dome Valley-Matakana statistical area.

Rainbows End had a population of 111 at the 2018 New Zealand census, an increase of 30 people (37.0%) since the 2013 census, and an increase of 30 people (37.0%) since the 2006 census. There were 51 households, comprising 54 males and 57 females, giving a sex ratio of 0.95 males per female. The median age was 62.1 years (compared with 37.4 years nationally), with 6 people (5.4%) aged under 15 years, 9 (8.1%) aged 15 to 29, 42 (37.8%) aged 30 to 64, and 54 (48.6%) aged 65 or older.

Ethnicities were 97.3% European/Pākehā, 2.7% Māori, 2.7% Pacific peoples, 2.7% Asian, and 0.0% other ethnicities. People may identify with more than one ethnicity.

Religions were 51.4% irreligious, 37.8% Christian, and 2.7% Muslim. The remaining 8.1% chose not to answer the question.

Of those at least 15 years old, 27 (25.7%) people had a bachelor's or higher degree, and 15 (14.3%) people had no formal qualifications. The median income was $31,700, compared with $31,800 nationally. 21 people (20.0%) earned over $70,000 compared to 17.2% nationally. The employment status of those at least 15 was that 33 (31.4%) people were employed full-time, 15 (14.3%) were part-time, and 3 (2.9%) were unemployed.

Notes

Matakana Coast
Rodney Local Board Area
Populated places in the Auckland Region